Achaea balteata are  species of moth of the family Erebidae. They are foun (?)

This species has a wingspan of 47 mm.

References

Achaea (moth)
Moths of Madagascar
Moths described in 1912